Mary Wibberley ( – 29 December 2013) was an English romantic fiction writer. Born in Worsley, she wrote 48 novels for Mills & Boon. Her first novel, Black Niall, was published in 1973. Wibberley died following a short illness on 29 December 2013, aged 79. Her funeral took place on 30 December.

References

1930s births
2013 deaths
People from Worsley
English romantic fiction writers
Women romantic fiction writers
English women novelists
20th-century English novelists
20th-century English women writers